Cerithium nodulosum is a species of sea snail, a marine gastropod mollusk in the family Cerithiidae.

Description

Distribution
The distribution of Cerithium nodulosum includes the Indo-Pacific and Red Sea.

References

Cerithiidae
Gastropods described in 1792